Białopole  is a village in the administrative district of Gmina Bogatynia, within Zgorzelec County, Lower Silesian Voivodeship, in south-western Poland, close to the Czech and German borders. Prior to 1945 it was in Germany.

Gallery

References

Villages in Zgorzelec County